Debretsion Gebremichael is an Ethiopian politician and current president of the Tigray Region and chairman of Tigray People's Liberation Front (TPLF). His position as titular head of the Tigray Region is disputed by the federal government of Ethiopia who in November 2020 appointed Mulu Nega as the chief executive of the Transitional Government of Tigray, succeeded by Abraham Belay. Since July 2021, Debretsion leads again the Tigray Region, while Abraham Belay left the transitional government to become Ethiopia's minister of Defence.

His party nominally won all 152 contested seats and 98.2% of the votes of the 2020 Tigray regional election, which was held in defiance of the federal government that had postponed the elections because of the COVID-19 pandemic in Ethiopia.

Early life
Debretsion was born and raised in the town of Shire in Tigray. He gave up his engineering studies at Addis Ababa University to join the TPLF in the 1970s and fight the Derg military junta. He was sent to Italy on a false passport and received training in communications technology and led the team that launched the Dimtsi Woyane ('Voice of the Revolution') radio station in 1980. Debretsion was also involved in disrupting the Derg's radio systems.

Education 
After the Ethiopian People's Revolutionary Democratic Front's 1991 victory, he joined Addis Ababa University while working full-time as the second man to Kinfe Gebremedhin. He earned his bachelor's and master's degrees in electrical engineering from Addis Ababa University. He received a PhD in information technology from Capella University in 2011. His dissertation was on "Exploring the Perception of Users of Community ICT Centers on the Effectiveness of ICT on Poverty in Ethiopia".

Personal life
Debretsion is an avid tennis player in his free time.

He married Askale Gebrekidan. He has two young children. They are US citizens.

Political career
In 2005, Debretsion was appointed director of the Ethiopian Information and Communication Development Agency (EICDA). As its director, Debretsion claimed to improve its public service by launching the Public Service Capacity Building Program (PSCAP). In 2007, Debretsion launched a $1.5 billion infrastructure project with ZTE which expanded the network capacity to 30 million (from 6.5 million in 2007 and 1.35 million in 2001) and constructed 10,000 km of fibre cable. By 2012 Ethiopia had constructed 16,000 km of fibre cables and had voice cellular coverage at 64% of the country. In 2012, Debretsion was appointed the federal Minister of Communications and Information Technology. In 2012, Debretsion announced that a $1.6 billion deal had been reached with Huawei, Ericsson and ZTE to significantly expand the capacity of Ethiopia's communication infrastructure. As of September 2016 project has been progressing on schedule. 4G cellular service is now available in Addis Ababa. The ultimate goal of the project is to increase cellular coverage to 100% and to increase capacity to 50 million. Before becoming Tigray's leader, he was sometimes considered as a "low-key technocrat" according to The New York Times.

Debretsion was appointed as Deputy Prime Minister for Finance and Economic Clusters in 2012. In 2015, Debretsion helped to launch a free trade zone with Sudan. In 2015, he inaugurated the construction of the ICT park in Bole Lemi Industrial Park in Addis Ababa. In 2017, he laid the cornerstone for the ICT park and stated that he wants to build more ICT parks in the regional states.

Debretsion was the Board Chair of Ethiopian Electric Power Corporation. In his role in the state owned electricity company, he oversaw the construction of billions of dollars of hydropower dams and electrical infrastructure, as well as seeing service as the Board Chairman of the National Council for the Coordination of Public Participation for the Construction of the Grand Ethiopian Renaissance Dam.

In November 2017, Debretsion was elected chairman of the TPLF. His rise within the party was largely facilitated by the fact that he was viewed as a younger figure when compared to the high-ranking figures that had led the TPLF for decades prior, as well as the perception that he was a political moderate who was less committed to Tigrayan nationalism than his predecessors. In January 2018, he was also elected Deputy President of Tigray Region. As Debretsion was not a member of the Tigray Regional parliament, he could not become president. Nonetheless, as the post of the President became vacant, he became the President of Tigray Region in an acting capacity.

Tigray War

On 4 November 2020, the Tigray War started with the TPLF special forces' 4 November attacks against the Northern Command. Debretsion described the attacks as a pre-emptive defensive action. On 12 November, the Federal Police Commission issued an arrest warrant against him and 64 top officials of the TPLF for severe human rights violations, ethnic cleansing, and terrorism.

The Ethiopian government announced a military victory against TPLF on 28 November 2020. Debretsion was rumoured to have taken refuge in South Sudan until his message to all TEGARUs came out in March claiming that he is, in fact, near the town of Mekelle (Tigray's capital) stating the TDF forces are still fighting intensively and the outcome will only be victory of the people of Tigray. As of early December 2020, TPLF members and their leader Debretsion resisted the Ethiopian and Eritrean invasion by remaining in the mountains.

In June 2021, after the TDF controlled Mekelle, Debretsion returned to the capital of Tigray, Mekelle and remains among the main political influencers of this conflict.

See also
Resistance movement
List of ongoing armed conflicts

References

Living people
Presidents of Tigray Region
Deputy Prime Ministers of Ethiopia
Government ministers of Ethiopia
People from Tigray Region
Tigray People's Liberation Front politicians
Ethiopian People's Revolutionary Democratic Front politicians
Year of birth missing (living people)
People of the Ethiopian Civil War
21st-century Ethiopian politicians